Vadym Hostyev (born January 19, 1987) is a Ukrainian footballer who plays with Toronto Falcons in the Canadian Soccer League.

Club career

Europe  
Hostyev began his career in 2005 with FC Krasyliv in the Ukrainian First League where he played for two seasons. He had a brief stint in the Ukrainian Amateur League in 2006 with Iskra-Skirts on a loan deal. In 2009, he played abroad in Moldavia's National Division with FC Sfântul Gheorghe Suruceni. He made his debut for Suruceni on July 5, 2009, against FC Nistru Otaci. After a season abroad he returned to the Ukrainian Second League to play with Helios Kharkiv. 

In 2010, he played in the Ukrainian Second League with MFC Mykolaiv where he assisted the club in securing promotion by winning the league title. He played in his native town of Odesa, the following season with Real Pharma Odesa. In 2012, he signed with city rivals FC Odesa which marked his return to the second division. 

After the relegation of Odesa, he returned to the third division. In 2015, he played with Zhemchuzhina Yalta.

Canada 
In 2016, he went overseas to Canada to sign with FC Ukraine United of the Canadian Soccer League. Throughout the season he helped Ukraine United secure a playoff berth by finishing second in the First Division. In his debut season, he played in 21 matches and recorded one goal. After Ukraine United relegated themselves voluntarily to the Second Division he signed with expansion side FC Vorkuta in 2017. 

In his debut season with Vorkuta, he assisted the club in securing the First Division title. The following season he helped Vorkuta secure a postseason berth and contributed a goal in the semifinals against SC Waterloo Region. He was featured in the CSL Championship match and secured the title against Scarborough SC. In 2020, he assisted in securing Vorkuta's second championship title after defeating Scarborough SC once more.  

In his fifth and final season with Vorkuta, he assisted in securing Vorkuta's third regular-season title and secured the ProSound Cup against Scarborough. He also played in the 2021 playoffs where Vorkuta was defeated by Scarborough in the championship final. In 2022, he signed with expansion franchise Toronto Falcons.

International career 
In 2007, he played with the Ukrainian national student's football team and received the title of Master of Sports of Ukraine of international class.

Honors 
FC Vorkuta
 CSL Championship: 2018, 2020
 Canadian Soccer League First Division/Regular Season: 2017, 2019, 2021 
ProSound Cup: 2021

References

External links
 

1987 births
Living people
Footballers from Odesa
Ukrainian footballers
Ukraine student international footballers
Ukrainian expatriate footballers
FC Krasyliv players
FC Sfîntul Gheorghe players
FC Helios Kharkiv players
MFC Mykolaiv players
FC Real Pharma Odesa players
FC Dnister Ovidiopol players
FC Enerhiya Mykolaiv players
FC Zhemchuzhyna Odesa players
FC Ukraine United players
FC Continentals players
Moldovan Super Liga players
Canadian Soccer League (1998–present) players
Expatriate footballers in Moldova
Association football midfielders
Ukrainian First League players